FabricLive.77 is a DJ mix album by English musician Erol Alkan. The album was released as part of the FabricLive Mix Series.

Track listing

References

External links
FabricLive 77 at Fabric

Fabric (club) albums
2014 compilation albums